Seguin de Badefol was a Medieval leader of a large bandit army or Routier With 2000 troops he was the head of the largest group of Tard-Venus.

Private life
He was born in 1330 in the castle of Badefols, the son of Seguin Gontaut de Badefol and Margaret de Bérail, daughter of Arnaud de Cervole he was given the nickname Chopin Badefol.

Career
He fought at the Battle of Poitiers in 1356 and in 1360 after the Treaty of Brétigny, and without employ, he led a band of brigands, with Bertucat d'Albret in 1361 into the Languedoc, Roussillon, Toulouse and Rouergue districts. In 1362, with Bertucat took Montbrun, plundered Saint-Flour then participated with Meschin, at the Battle of Brignais against Jacques de Bourbon Count of La Marche. In 1363, refusing to go to Italy with most of the other Routiers, he returned to plunder the Languedoc area with Petit Meschin, Louis Rabaud, Arnaud du Solis and Espiote took Brioude on 13 September.

In 1364, the band devastated the region between Lyon and Mâcon. When Seguin Brioude evacuated Clermont under an agreement of 21 May 1364, he did not immediately withdraw in Gascony. Instead he stayed at and became master of the Saone and Rhone region and captured sixty castles including that of Anse in November 1364. After eight months of occupation, in July 1365  Pope Urban V, gave John II of France a sum of 40,000 florins to pay his company out of the kingdom. To enforce this the pope held his father and brothers as hostages in Avignon. At the end of arguments the Pope paid the Tard-Venus to leave and then excommunicated Badefol around August 1365.

The troops of Seguin Badefol also made raids in Puy, Chaise-Dieu in Clermont, Montferrand, Chilhac, Riom, Nonnette, Issoire, Saint-Bonnet Arsis and ravaging Auvergne. Finally, after holding Brioude for more than a year, Seguin Badefol evacuates for a fee and retires with his treasures to Gascony, his native country.

Here Charles II of Navarre employed him but while in his service he was poisoned with figs in Pamplona in December 1365. The historian Germain Butaud, believes he died of poison in Falces in February 1366 after eating quince and pears.

References

1330 births
People of the Hundred Years' War
Medieval mercenaries
14th century in France
Deaths by poisoning